Savage Garden is the second studio album by the Finnish rock band The 69 Eyes. It also features Andy McCoy from Hanoi Rocks on "Wild Talk". The album has traces of what would be known as their "goth n' roll" sound, as seen in their song "Velvet Touch".

Track listing 
 "1-800-SLEAZORAMA" – 0:49
 "Tang" – 3:27
 "Smashed 'n' Trashed" – 2:55
 "Velvet Touch" – 4:18
 "Mr. Pain" – 2:25
 "Lady Luck" – 3:27
 "Motor City Resurrection" – 3:56
 "Ghettoway Car" – 2:58
 "Wild Talk" – feat. Andy McCoy 4:04
 "Get It Off" – 3:16
 "Always" – 2:47
 "Demolition Derby" – 4:13
 "Savage Garden" – 2:50
 "1-800-SLEAZORAMA (reprise)" – 0:50

Bonus tracks
 "TV Eye" (The Stooges cover) – 3:50
 "Motormouth" – 3:03
 "One-Shot Woman" – 3:16

Singles 
"Velvet Touch"
"Tang"
"Velvet Touch"
"TV Eye"
"Motormouth"

Personnel 
J. Darling – vocals
Bazie – lead guitar
Timo-Timo – rhythm guitar
Archzie – bass
Jussi – drums

References 

1995 albums
The 69 Eyes albums